Electroimpact is an aerospace engineering manufacturer founded by Peter Zieve in July 1986 and based in Mukilteo, Washington.

History
Electroimpact was founded by Peter Zieve in July 1986 in Seattle, Washington after he invented low voltage electromagnetic riveting as a doctorate student at the University of Washington. At the time, the company was based on Blakely Street. The first machine was sold to Northrop Grumman, and later the company sold machines to Boeing and Textron Aerostructures. In 1992, Electoimpact moved its headquarters to Mukilteo, Washington, where it is one of the largest employers in the city. The company is a major supplier for Boeing and Airbus. The company operates on five continents and maintains a 100-employee location in the United Kingdom which primarily supports the assembly of Airbus planes.

Controversies
In 2015, Peter Zieve told employees that he would bring a $1,000 check to any wedding he attended, and until 2016, any employee who got married while working at the company received a $1,000 bonus payment, despite a state law prohibiting employment discrimination on the basis of marriage. Employees are also given bonus payments for births of children.

Electroimpact has also been criticized for its lack of diversity. In June 2016, the United States Department of Labor reported that 94.5% of the company’s 474 engineers were white. Only three percent of engineers at the company are women. Additionally, Peter Zieve has been accused of Islamophobia, harassment, and of fostering a hostile work environment on multiple occasions. In April 2016, Zieve's anti-muslim comments resulted in the Muslim community calling for a boycott of Electroimpact.

In March 2017, Electroimpact was criticized for its refusal to hire Muslims. According to a complaint filed by the Attorney General of Washington, Bob Ferguson, CEO Peter Zieve "asked for a photo of all job applications and then screened out anyone who said they were Muslim or who he believed to be Muslim based on their name, photograph or national origin". In 2016, an employee objected to an anti-Muslim statement sent by Zieve to the company email list and was told to leave the company. Electroimpact agreed to pay a civil rights settlement of $485,000, that Peter Zieve would no longer take part in hiring for non-management positions or review employee complaints, and that the company would not base compensation on marital status.

Awards
 Pacific Northwest Aerospace Alliance "Aerospace Company of the Year" (2014)

References

1986 establishments in Washington (state)
Companies based in Mukilteo, Washington
Companies based in Snohomish County, Washington
Mukilteo, Washington
Manufacturing companies established in 1986
Technology companies established in 1986
Vehicle manufacturing companies established in 1986